The East–West Shrine Bowl is a postseason college football all-star game that has been played annually since 1925; through the January 2019 playing, it was known as the East–West Shrine Game. The game is sponsored by the fraternal group Shriners International, and the net proceeds are earmarked to some of the Shrine's charitable works, most notably the Shriners Hospitals for Children. The game's slogan is "Strong Legs Run That Weak Legs May Walk".

Teams consist of players from colleges in the Eastern United States vs. the Western United States. Players must be college seniors who are eligible to play for their schools. The game and the practice sessions leading up to it attract dozens of scouts from professional teams. Since 1985, Canadian players playing in Canadian university football have also been invited (even though U Sports and the NCAA play by different football codes).  As such, this is the only current bowl or all-star game in either the Canadian or American college football schedules to include players from both Canadian and American universities.

Since 1979, the game has been played in January, and has been played on January 10 or later since 1986. The later game dates allow players from teams whose schools were involved in bowl games to participate, which is important, as these teams often have some of the very best players.

History 

For most of its history, the game was played in the San Francisco Bay Area, usually at San Francisco's Kezar Stadium or Stanford Stadium at Stanford University, with Pacific Bell Park/SBC Park (now Oracle Park) as a host in its final years in Northern California. For more than half of the games played in the Bay Area, entertainment was provided by the marching band from Santa Cruz High School.

In January 1942, the game was played in New Orleans, due to the December 7, 1941, Japanese attack on Pearl Harbor. This one-year relocation was based upon fears that playing the game on the west coast could make the contest and the stadium a potential target for an additional attack. The game, originally planned for January 1 in San Francisco, was played on January 3 at Tulane Stadium, two days after the 1942 Sugar Bowl was held there.

A similar all-star game, the North–South Shrine Game, was played in Miami from 1948 to 1973, and a final time in Pontiac, Michigan, in 1976.

In 2006, the game moved to Texas, leaving the San Francisco Bay area for the first time since 1942, and was played at the Alamodome in San Antonio. The growth of cable television meant NFL scouts could now view players around the country, making postseason all-star games less important. Even so, the game's organizers relaxed efforts towards attracting top players to the game, meaning many of college football's best players went to the Senior Bowl instead. In 2007, the game relocated to Houston and was played at Reliant Stadium, home of the NFL's Houston Texans, to be closer to one of the 22 Shriners Hospitals for Children; Texas has two Shriner's hospitals, one in Houston and the other in Galveston. The 2008 and 2009 games were held at Robertson Stadium on the campus of the University of Houston.

In 2010, the game moved to Florida, and was held at the Citrus Bowl in Orlando. Television coverage moved from ESPN/ESPN2 to the NFL Network, starting with the 2011 game. After two years in Orlando, the 2012 game was held at Tropicana Field in St. Petersburg; it was the sixth different venue (in five cities and three states) in a span of eight contests.

Starting with the January 2017 game, the NFL now supplies coaching staffs for the game, drawing from assistant coaches of teams who did not advance to the NFL postseason, and the game is now officiated by NFL officials. The game is played under NFL rules, with some restrictions, such as no motion or shifts by the offense, and no stunts or blitzes by the defense. Prior to the January 2020 playing, organizers renamed the game from East–West Shrine Game to East–West Shrine Bowl.

The 2021 edition of the game, which had been scheduled for January 23, was cancelled due to concerns related to the COVID-19 pandemic.

In July 2021, it was announced that Allegiant Stadium would host the East–West Shrine Bowl on February 3, 2022; the game was scheduled as part of festivities for the 2022 Pro Bowl being held there the following Sunday.

Game results
Through the January 2023 game (98 editions, 97 games played), the West leads all-time with 53 wins to the East's 39 wins, while 5 games have tied.

 For the December 1925 game, NCAA records list a 7–0 final score, while contemporary newspaper accounts report 6–0.

MVPs
The game first named a Most Valuable Player for the January 1945 playing (Bob Waterfield, UCLA quarterback), and named a single MVP through the December 1952 game. Starting with the January 1954 game, two MVPs are selected for each game; they receive the William H. Coffman Award for Most Outstanding Offensive Player, and the E. Jack Spaulding Award for Most Outstanding Defensive Player. Coffman was managing director of the game for 40 years, while Spaulding was one of the organizers of the inaugural playing of the game. MVPs starting with the January 2000 game are listed below; a complete list is provided on the official website.

Canadian invitees 
Although the game is an American football competition, players of Canadian university football, contested under Canadian football rules, have been invited to each game played since 1985, when Calgary Dinos offensive lineman Tom Spoletini played. Usually, Canadian players on the West team come from Canada West schools, while Canadian players on the East team are from the other three Canadian conferences (Ontario University Athletics, Atlantic University Sport, and Quebec Student Sport Federation). One exception was Sean McEwen of the Calgary Dinos (a Canada West school), who played on the East squad in the 2016 game. Through the 2023 game, the Calgary Dinos have had the most invitees, with 13.

The only Canadian team that competes under American football rules is the Simon Fraser Red Leafs. To date, the only Simon Fraser player to be invited to the game is Ibrahim Khan, who played in 2004.

Hall of fame
A hall of fame was established in 2002, with additional former players being added each year. Through 2020 inductees, there are currently 61 members of the hall of fame.

Inductees range from having played in game No. 10 (January 1935) to game No. 78 (January 2003), with game No. 48 (December 1972) having the most players honored, five.

Pat Tillman Award

Game organizers initiated a Pat Tillman Award in 2005, the year that Tillman was posthumously inducted to the game's hall of fame, to recognize "a player who best exemplifies character, intelligence, sportsmanship and service".

Head coaches who played in the game

Several people have participated in the game first as a player and subsequently as a head coach.

References

External links
 

 
Recurring sporting events established in 1925
Shriners
College football all-star games